Delmonico's is the name of a series of restaurants that operated in New York City, with the present version located at 56 Beaver Street in the Financial District of Manhattan. The original version was widely recognized as the United States’ first fine dining restaurant. Beginning as a small cafe and pastry shop in 1827, Delmonico’s eventually grew into a hospitality empire that encompassed several luxury restaurants catering to titans of industry, the political elite and cultural luminaries. In many respects, Delmonico’s represented the genesis of American fine dining cuisine, pioneering numerous restaurant innovations, developing iconic American dishes, and setting a standard for dining excellence. Ultimately, Delmonico’s ironically closed under the Delmonico family in 1923 during America’s largest economic boom and explosion of wealth.

History

Origin
The original Delmonico's opened in 1827 in a rented pastry shop at 23 William Street, and appeared in a list of restaurants in 1830. It was opened by Italian-Swiss immigrants, the brothers Giovanni and Pietro Delmonico. In 1831, they were joined by their nephew, Lorenzo, who eventually became responsible for the restaurant's wine list and menu.

The brothers moved their restaurant several times before settling at 56 Beaver Street (also 2 South William Street). When the building was opened on a grand scale in August 1837 after the Great Fire of New York, New Yorkers were told that the columns by the entrance had been imported from the ruins of Pompeii. It eventually became one of the most famous restaurants in New York, with its reputation eventually growing to national prominence.

Expansion and closure
Beginning in the 1850s, the restaurant hosted the annual gathering of the New England Society of New York, which featured many important speakers of the day. In 1860, Delmonico's provided the supper at the Grand Ball welcoming the Prince of Wales at the Academy of Music on East 14th Street. Supper was set out in a specially constructed room; the menu was French, and the pièces montées represented Queen Victoria and Prince Albert, the Great Eastern and Flora's Vase. The New York Times reported, "We may frankly say that we have never seen a public supper served in a more inapproachable fashion, with greater discretion, or upon a more luxurious scale". In 1862, the restaurant hired Charles Ranhofer, considered one of the greatest chefs of his day.  In 1876 news of the prices at Delmonicos restaurants spread at least as far as Colorado where complaints about the cost of wine, eggs, bread and butter, coffee, and potatoes ("2 potatoes cost 15 cents") appeared in the Pueblo Daily Chieftain.

The business was so successful that from 1865 to 1888, it expanded to four restaurants of the same name. At various times, there were Delmonico's at ten locations. Delmonico's vacated the six-story Delmonico Building at Fifth Avenue and 26th Street in 1899. The edifice was sold to John B. Martin, owner of the Martin Hotel, in May 1901.

In 1919, Edward L.C. Robins purchased Delmonico's. Its grand location at Fifth Avenue and 44th Street closed in 1923 as a result of changing dining habits due to Prohibition. That location was the final incarnation of Delmonico's with continuity to the original.

Later revivals 
In 1926, Oscar Tucci purchased the restaurant and opened Oscar's Delmonico at 56 Beaver Street. The Tucci incarnation adopted the original menus and recipes, and became distinguished in its own right, continuing to attract prominent politicians and celebrities, such as Lana Turner, Marilyn Monroe, Rock Hudson, Lena Horne, Elizabeth Taylor, Elvis, JFK, Jackie Kennedy Onassis and others. Tucci also instituted many of the professional standards in use today in American restaurants known as the Delmonico way . The Tucci era also produced four of the most prominent restaurateurs of the twentieth century: Sirio Maccioni of Le Cirque, Tony May of San Domenico and the Rainbow Room, Harry Poulakakos of Harry's located in Hanover Square and, Lello Arpaia, father to restaurateur Donatella Arpaia. Oscar's Delmonico was open continuously until it closed in 1977. The interior was gutted thereafter. In 1984 Tucci’s son Mario opened a "Delmonico's" in  Greenwich, Connecticut which closed in 1987. 

The Tucci family penned a licensing deal with Edward Huber to operate "Delmonico's" in 1982 at 56 Beaver Street,  operating it until 1993.  

In 1997, the BiCE Group took full ownership of the restaurant, renovated the location and reopened Delmonico's with Gian Pietro Branchi as executive chef. The restaurant reopened in May 1998 following a renovation by Morris Nathanson. In 1999, the restaurant was sold to the Ocinomled partnership. The restaurant was forced to close temporarily in 2020 due to the COVID-19 pandemic in New York City, and 56 Beaver Street's owner Time Equities was in the process of evicting the restaurant by 2022. In January 2023, Dennis Turcinovic and Joseph Licul signed a new lease on the building.

Signature dishes
Delmonico Potatoes were invented at Delmonico's restaurant, and possibly Chicken à la King, but it was most famous for Delmonico steak. Eggs Benedict were also said to have originated at Delmonico's, although others claim that dish as well.

It is often said that the name "Baked Alaska" was coined at Delmonico's as well, in 1867, by chef Charles Ranhofer. However, no contemporary account exists of this occurrence and Ranhofer himself referred to the dish, in 1894, as "Alaska Florida", apparently referring to the contrast between extremes of heat and cold. It is also said that Lobster Newberg was invented at the restaurant.

Under Oscar Tucci's ownership of Delmonico's, he created the wedge salad. After a trip to a Bridgeport, Connecticut farm, Tucci picked the ingredients that became the salad. Tucci added bacon to the dish shortly after. The salad became an instant favorite, though some restaurateurs criticized the salad saying it was drenched in dressing. Today the wedge salad is served internationally.

Notable patrons
Among the many well-known people who patronized Delmonico's are Jenny Lind, who, it was said, ate there after every show; Theodore Roosevelt; Chester Arthur; Mark Twain; Arthur Sullivan; "Diamond Jim" Brady; Lillian Russell, usually in the company of Brady; Charles Dickens; Oscar Wilde; J.P. Morgan; James Gordon Bennett, Jr.; Nikola Tesla; Commodore Matthew C. Perry; Edward VII while Prince of Wales; and Napoleon III of France. Journalist Jacob A. Riis said he was a patron of a different sort: in his book The Making of an American, he stated that when he was down on his luck a kindly French-speaking cook at Delmonico's would pass him rolls through the basement window.

Clarence Day, Jr. wrote of eating lunch at Delmonico's with his father in his collection of short stories Life with Father. In the 1947 film of the same name, a scene takes place in the restaurant; it likely recreates the William Street location.

Under the Tucci ownership, Delmonico’s also known as Oscar’s Delmonico or OlDelmonico's served Hollywood's elite, Politicians and Businesses Tycoons such as JFK, President Nixon, Malcolm Forbes, Jacqueline Kennedy Onassis, Rock Hudson, Elizabeth Taylor, Lena Horne, Lana Turner, The Gabor Sisters, Eva Gabor and Zsa Zsa Gabor, Red Buttons, Virginia Graham, Liberace. Katyna Ranieri, Bella Abzug and Gypsy Rose Lee.

In recent years, the restaurant served Academy Award Winners Denzel Washington and Whoopi Goldberg.

Other Delmonico's restaurants 
The New Orleans, Louisiana, Delmonico's, which opened in 1895, was purchased by Emeril Lagasse in 1997. Lagasse refurbished the restaurant and reopened it as Emeril's Delmonico. Emeril's Delmonico has no connection to Delmonico's in New York City at 56 Beaver Street. Since 1923, there have been four different owners of a restaurant named "Delmonico’s" located at 56 Beaver Street, none of which are connected to the original Delmonico family.

Delmonico's Italian Steakhouse is a chain of restaurants with six locations in Upstate New York and Florida. This chain has no connection the Delmonico's Restaurant located at 56 Beaver Street.

Menus

See also

List of New York City Landmarks
National Register of Historic Places listings in New York County, New York

References

Bibliography
New York Architecture Images  EDelmonico's

External links

1827 establishments in New York (state)
History of New York City
Restaurants in Manhattan
Restaurants established in 1827
Fine dining
Upper class culture in New York City